Spring Garden Street could refer to:
 An east–west street in Philadelphia, Pennsylvania
 Spring Garden Street station, a disused commuter rail station in Philadelphia
 Spring Garden Street Bridge, a highway bridge in Philadelphia
 A street in the north inner city area of Dublin, Ireland

See also 
 Spring Garden (disambiguation)